Changes is the third album by Swedish AOR/rock band Alyson Avenue with new vocalist Arabella Vitanc. Alyson Avenue released their third album "Changes" through Avenue of Allies. The record was co-produced by band members and Chris Laney (Crazy Lixx, H.E.A.T., Brian Robertson) and includes guest appearances by Anette Olzon (ex-Nightwish, Ex-Alyson Avenue), Michael Bormann (Ex-Jaded Heart, Charade, BISS), Rob Marcello (Danger Danger, Marcello - Vestry), Fredrik Bergh, (Street Talk, Bloodbound), Tommy Stråhle and Mike Andersson (Cloudscape, Planet Alliance).

Background and reception 
Over six years since Alyson Avenue released their second album, the band was able to re-emerge with a new sound and vocalist. After Anette Olzon left after becoming the new singer for Nightwish, Alyson Avenue had been searching for a new vocalist since 2007, until they announced Swedish singer Arabella Vitanc two years later.

Critics gives Changes positive reviews for this album, for background vocals, rhythmic guitars, and its bombastic sound.

Track listing
 Liar - 4:13
 Will I Make Love - 4:17
 Changes - 3:51
 Amazing Days - 3:57
 Don't Know If Love Is Alive - 4:37
 Fallen - 4:08
 Into the Fire - 4:41
 I Will Be Waiting - 3:37
 I'll Cry For You - 3:53
 Somewhere - 4:15
 Always Keep on Loving You - 4:10	
 Alone (Japanese bonus track)

Personnel
Arabella Vitanc - Vocals
Niclas Olsson - Keyboards
Thomas Löyskä - Bass
Tony Rohtla - Guitars
Fredrik Eriksson - Drums

References 

2011 albums
Alyson Avenue albums